Pushpa is an upcoming Indian Telugu-language film directed by Sukumar

Pushpa is a male or female given name in India and Nepal which means "flower" in Sanskrit.

Notable people with the name include:

Maitreyi Pushpa (born 1944), Indian freelance writer
Pushpa Devi Singh (born 1948), Indian politician associated with the National Congress Party
Pushpa Kamal Dahal (born 1954) Nepalese politician and former Prime minister of Nepal
Pushpa Lal Shrestha (1924–1978), the founding general secretary of the Communist Party of Nepal
Pushpa Pradhan (born 1981), a member of the India women's national field-hockey team
Pushpa Raj Pokharel, Nepalese politician belonging to the CPN (UML)
Pushpa Thangadorai (1921-2013), Tamil-language author of religious pilgrimage travelogues

See also
 Pushpa Vimana - Pushpa (flower)+ Vimana (flight) - ‘A flight of flowers’ is a mythical flight found in Ayyavazhi mythology